Chrysolina brunsvicensis is a species of leaf beetle in the genus Chrysolina. It is associated with plants of the genus Hypericum.

Description
C. brunsvicensis adult beetles measure 5.3–6.33 mm in length. They have a metallic, brassy colouration.

References

Beetles described in 1807
Chrysomelinae
Taxa named by Johann Ludwig Christian Gravenhorst